Deborah A. Rathjen  is the executive chair and CEO of biOasis Technologies. She was previously head of Bionomics Incorporated. She is experienced in developing and managing biotechnology organisations.

Career
Deborah Rathjen has a Bachelor of Science from Flinders University and a PhD in immunology from Macquarie University.

She was employed as manager, business development and licensing for the Peptech Group until 2000, when she resigned to join Bionomics in 2000. In 2016, she was assigned a term role in The Prime Minister's Science Engineering and Innovation Council and the Federal Government's Innovation and Science Australia's Biomedical Translation Fund Committee for a six-year term. Also in 2016 Rathjen was appointed an inaugural member of the Australian Medical Research Advisory Board, the body chaired by Professor Ian Frazer which advises the Medical Research Future Fund and is a board member of the Australian National Fabrication Facility. 

Rathjen moved from Bionomics to biOasis Technologies where, in 2019, she is executive chair and CEO.

In April 2019 she was appointed to the Million Minds Mission Advisory Panel.

Awards and recognition 

 Fellow, Australian Academy of Technology and Engineering, 2007
 Winner, Person of the Year, BioSpectrum Asia Pacific Awards, 2013

References

External links
Official website

Year of birth missing (living people)
Living people
Place of birth missing (living people)
Fellows of the Australian Academy of Technological Sciences and Engineering
21st-century Australian scientists
Australian women scientists
Australian business executives
Australian women chief executives
Australian chief executives